Statistics of Liberian Premier League in season 2008.

Overview
It was contested by 16 teams, and Monrovia Black Star Football Club won the championship.

References
Liberia - List of final tables (RSSSF)

Football competitions in Liberia
Lea